Cover is a unit of measurement in the hospitality industry. It can refer to a meal, or a customer for whom the meal is served. It is used for the purpose of business forecasting.

Definition
A cover means one customer paying for one meal. For example, a table for four diners can provide 4 covers, but if the table is used for two sittings, that becomes 8 covers.

Derived statistics
Cover per Occupied Room (CPOR) is one statistic which can be used in forecasting. 
This is the average spent per individual customer, which can be calculated separately for each member of the serving staff.
Polansky and McCool propose a capture ratio, given by the ratio of "Meal Period Covers Served" divided by the "Number of Persons Available to Eat that Meal".
This is another statistic which can be used to calculate the allocation of staff, based on the number of predicted covers required.

References

Hospitality management